Allen Flat is a flat in Cochise County, Arizona.

References

Landforms of Cochise County, Arizona